The 1992–93 UEFA Champions League group stage began on 25 November 1992 and ended on 21 April 1993. The 8 teams were divided into two groups of four, and the teams in each group played against each other on a home-and-away basis, meaning that each team played a total of six group matches. For each win, teams were awarded two points, with one point awarded for each draw. At the end of the group stage, the first team in each group advanced to the final.

Originally, the UEFA Champions League was only the group stage, a specific phase in the European Cup.

Groups
The matchdays were 25 November, 9 December, 3 and 17 March, and 7 and 21 April.

Group A

Group B

Group stage
UEFA Champions League group stages